Teodora Kolarova (born 29 May 1981 in Varna) is a Bulgarian middle distance runner.

She finished 6th in the 800m final at the 2006 European Athletics Championships in Gothenburg, setting a personal best time in the process. In 2007, she tested positive for testosterone and was banned from competition for two years by the Bulgarian federation.

References

1981 births
Bulgarian female middle-distance runners
Living people
Sportspeople from Varna, Bulgaria